Dryomyza formosa is a fly from the family Dryomyzidae.

Distribution
Found in the Indomalayan realm (India, Taiwan, and Vietnam), and very widespread in the Palearctic realm (China, Japan, Korea, and Russian Far East).

References

Dryomyzidae
Diptera of Asia
Insects described in 1830
Taxa named by Christian Rudolph Wilhelm Wiedemann